Tryon Country Club is a historic country club located near Tryon, Polk County, North Carolina.  The nine-hole golf course was originally laid out in 1914; the course opened in 1917.  The donor family attests that the layout was  designed by noted golfer Donald Ross.  The clubhouse was built in 1922, and is a one-story, five bay, Rustic Revival style log building with two projecting front-gable porches.  The pro shop and storage building was built about 1935, and is a one-story side-gable frame structure, with additions made about 1940, 1958, and 1972.  Also on the golf course is a contributing one-story frame building known as the Summer House and added in 1958.

It was added to the National Register of Historic Places in 2013.

References

Golf clubs and courses in North Carolina
Golf clubs and courses on the National Register of Historic Places
Sports venues on the National Register of Historic Places in North Carolina
Clubhouses on the National Register of Historic Places in North Carolina
National Register of Historic Places in Polk County, North Carolina
Buildings and structures completed in 1922
Buildings and structures in Polk County, North Carolina